Colonel Augustus Mervyn Owen Anwyl Anwyl-Passingham CBE DL JP (31 August 1880 – 22 November 1955) was a British soldier, recruiting officer and Territorial Army organiser.

Early life and family 
Born on August 31, 1880, Anwyl-Passingham belonged to a family of Anglo-Welsh gentry. He was the second and youngest son of Major Robert Townshend Anwyl-Passingham, JP, DL (1843–1893), of Bala, Merionethshire (who had taken the additional name of Anwyl in 1888), and his wife Lucy Emma (d. 1909), eldest daughter of Thomas Jeffreys Badger of Kingsland, Shropshire. His elder brother was the soldier Robert Townshend Anwyl-Passingham, OBE (1867–1926), and two of his sisters married Italian noblemen.

Career

Military 
Anwyl-Passingham was educated at Dover College, before joining The Middlesex Regiment in 1899 as a Second Lieutenant; he served in the Second Boer War (1901–02), and was promoted to a Lieutenant in 1903. Between 1905 and 1907, he was part of the Royal West African Frontier Force and in 1906 participated in the Hadeija and Sokoto expeditions in Nigeria. Returning to the United Kingdom thereafter, he was wounded in 1907 during rioting in Ireland. Promoted to Captain in 1911, he was appointed a Recruiting Staff Officer for the London Recruiting Area in 1913 and remained in that post after the onset of the First World War.

In January 1916, he was appointed a Staff Captain in the War Office with the temporary rank of Major; he was promoted to the full rank in July 1916, and in September he was appointed an Assistant Inspector of Registration and Recruiting in the War Office. He was made a Deputy Director of Recruiting with responsibility for Wales and was promoted to temporary Colonel in August 1917; he was appointed an Officer of the Order of the British Empire (OBE) in the 1918 New Year Honours for his services.

Anwyl-Passingham left that post and the temporary rank in May 1918, and was "recalled to the colours". According to his obituary in The Times, he served in Italy and was mentioned in dispatches. After the war, he served in Upper Silesia between 1919 and 1921, helping to oversee the preparations for its transfer to Poland. He was promoted to Colonel and retired in August 1922.

Retirement and later life 
In 1924, Anwyl-Passingham became secretary of the Middlesex Territorial Army and Air Force Association, serving until 1945. He was appointed a deputy lieutenant for Middlesex in 1927 and served as the county's high sheriff in 1938. In the 1942 New Year Honours, he was advanced to Commander of the Order of the British Empire (CBE). He died on November 22, 1955.

References 

1880 births
1955 deaths
Middlesex Regiment officers
Commanders of the Order of the British Empire
Deputy Lieutenants of Middlesex
High Sheriffs of Middlesex
British Army personnel of the Second Boer War
Royal West African Frontier Force officers
British Army personnel of World War I